Sentinel Plain volcanic field, also known as the Sentinel-Arlington volcanic field, is a monogenetic volcanic field in  Arizona. The basalt is alkali.

Notable Vents

See also
 Sentinel Plain
 List of volcanoes in the United States of America

References

External links
 
 The Gateway to Astronaut Photography of Earth

Volcanic fields of Arizona
Landforms of Yuma County, Arizona
Monogenetic volcanic fields
Pliocene volcanism
Pleistocene volcanism